A literary trope is the use of figurative language, via word, phrase or an image, for artistic effect such as using a figure of speech. Keith and Lundburg describe a trope as, "a substitution of a word or phrase by a less literal word or phrase." The word trope has also come to be used for describing commonly recurring or overused literary and rhetorical devices, motifs or clichés in creative works. Literary tropes span almost every category of writing, such as poetry, film, plays, and video games.

Origins
The term trope derives from the Greek  (tropos), "turn, direction, way", derived from the verb τρέπειν (trepein), "to turn, to direct, to alter, to change". Tropes and their classification were an important field in classical rhetoric. The study of tropes has been taken up again in modern criticism, especially in deconstruction. Tropological criticism (not to be confused with tropological reading, a type of biblical exegesis) is the historical study of tropes, which aims to "define the dominant tropes of an epoch" and to "find those tropes in literary and non-literary texts", an interdisciplinary investigation of which Michel Foucault was an "important exemplar".

In medieval writing
A specialized use is the medieval amplification of texts from the liturgy, such as in the Kyrie Eleison (Kyrie, / magnae Deus potentia, / liberator hominis, / transgressoris mandati, / eleison). The most important example of such a trope is the Quem quaeritis?, an amplification before the Introit of the Easter Sunday service and the source for liturgical drama. This particular practice came to an end with the Tridentine Mass, the unification of the liturgy in 1570 promulgated by Pope Pius V.

Types and examples
Rhetoricians have analyzed a variety of "twists and turns" used in poetry and literature and have provided a list of labels for these poetic devices. These include

Analogy - A comparison by showing how two seemingly different entities are alike, along with illustrating a larger point due to their commonalities.
 Emphasis - The use of an expression or term in a narrower and more precise sense than usual to accentuate a certain sense.
Hyperbole – The use of exaggeration to create a strong impression.
Irony – Creating a trope through implying the opposite of the standard meaning, such as describing a bad situation as "good times".
Litotes – A figure of speech and form of verbal irony in which understatement is used to emphasize a point by stating a negative to further affirm a positive, often incorporating double negatives for effect.
Metaphor – An explanation of an object or idea through juxtaposition of disparate things with a similar characteristic, such as describing a courageous person as having a "heart of a lion".
 * Allegory – A sustained metaphor continued through whole sentences or even through a whole discourse. For example, "The ship of state has sailed through rougher storms than the tempest of these lobbyists."
Metonymy – A trope through proximity or correspondence. For example, referring to actions of the U.S. President as "actions of the White House".
Antonomasia - A kind of metonymy in which an epithet or phrase takes the place of a proper name.
Synecdoche – A literary device, related to metonymy and metaphor, which creates a play on words by referring to something with a related concept. For example, referring to the whole with the name of a part, such as "hired hands" for workers; a part with the name of the whole, such as "the law" for police officers; the general with the specific, such as "bread" for food; the specific with the general, such as "cat" for a lion; or an object with its substance, such as "bricks and mortar" for a building.
Oxymoron  – The use of two opposite situations or things in one sentence to prove a point.
Pun or paronomasia - A form of word play that exploits multiple meanings of a term, or of similar-sounding words.
Antanaclasis – The stylistic trope of repeating a single word, but with a different meaning each time; antanaclasis is a common type of pun, and like other kinds of pun, it is often found in slogans.
Catachresis – A metaphor that is or can be a stretch for an audience to catch on to. Catachreses can be subjective; some people may find a metaphor to be too much while others may find it perfectly reasonable.

For a longer list, see Figure of speech: Tropes.

Kenneth Burke has called metaphor, metonymy, synecdoche and irony the "four master tropes" owing to their frequency in everyday discourse.

These tropes can be used to represent common recurring themes throughout creative works, and in a modern setting relationships and character interactions. It can also be used to denote examples of common repeating figures of speech and situations.

Whilst most of the various forms of phrasing described above are in common usage, most of the terms themselves are not, in particular antanaclasis, litotes, metonymy, synecdoche and catachresis.

See also

 Fantasy tropes
 Invariance principle
 Literary topos
 Meme
 Motif-Index of Folk-Literature
 Scheme (linguistics)
 Stereotype
 Tropological reading
 TV Tropes

References

Citations

Sources 

 Baldrick, Chris. 2008. Oxford Dictionary of Literary Terms. Oxford University Press. New York. 
 Corbett, Edward P. J. and Connors, Robert J. 1999. Style and Statement. Oxford University Press. New York, Oxford. 
 Kennedy, X.J. et al. 2006. The Longman Dictionary of Literary Terms: Vocabulary for the Informed Reader. Pearson, Longman. New York. 
 Forsyth, Mark. 2014. The Elements of Eloquence. Berkley Publishing Group/Penguin Publishing. New York. 
 Quinn, Edward. 1999. A Dictionary of Literary and Thematic Terms. Checkmark Books. New York. 
 

Figures of speech
Rhetoric
Literary concepts
Narrative units
Literary motifs
Tropes

ca:Trop literari
cs:Trop